The Centre for Excellence in Computational Engineering and Networking (CEN) at Amrita Vishwa Vidyapeetham, a research university in India, is a research and teaching center works on technologies to solving computational problems that can be applied in real world projects. The centre is involved in research projects funded by organizations like ISRO, NPOL, Indian Ministry of Electronics and Information Technology and Department of Science and Technology.

The center is involved in the areas of Artificial intelligence, Machine learning, Computational Linguistics, Data science and Natural Language Processing. A translation project is underway to develop tools to translate web content from English to Indian languages. Research is also ongoing in the area of speech translation. The centre conducts a Masters in Technology programme in Computational Engineering  and Networking and Remote Sensing and Wireless Sensor Networks

CEN is a centre within the Amrita Schools of Engineering campuses. The centre is headed by Dr K P Soman  who has been in the research field for more than 25 years. He secured his PhD from  IIT Kharagpur and was scientific officer in the Reliability Engineering Centre, IIT Kharagpur, before joining Amrita.

The center offers Bachelor of Technology in Artificial intelligence, Computer science and engineering and Master of Technology in Computational Engineering and Networking, Data science, Remote Sensing & Wireless Sensor Network, Machine learning, Cyber security, Natural language processing, Computer network, Embedded Computing and Control, Robotics and Computer Vision, Computational chemistry, Quantum computing, Scientific Computing and Applications, Wireless Communication, Signal processing, Computer vision, Digital image processing and Information systems.

References

External links
 Amrita CEN website
 Amrita - New York universities launch joint programmes, The Hindu, 3 January 2006

Engineering colleges in Tamil Nadu